Odundun I, otherwise known as Ọ̀dúndún asòdedẹ̀rọ̀ (Yoruba: Aládélúsì Oṣùpá Aṣọdẹ́bóyèdé; c. 1835 - 1890) was a Yoruba monarch. He ruled the Akure Kingdom from 1882 until 1890.

His lineal descendants are today known as the House of Osupa/Odundun. They serve as one of Akure's two legally recognized royal families.

Early life
Oba Odundun I was born as Prince Aladelusi in Akure around the year c.1835, as a member of the Asodeboyede Dynasty. He was the son of Oba Osupa I, who ruled Akure from 1834 until 1846, and through him claimed hereditary kinship with all of the preceding rulers of both Akure and the neighbouring kingdoms of Ijeshaland and Ikereland, and Olori Ọ̀bọ́wẹ̀, from the town of Ado Ekiti. He had many half-siblings from both his mother and his father. His mother was married twice previously, where she had two sons (Ọ̀tẹ́kùn, with the chief Ọ̀bẹ̀lé, and Fátúyọ̀lé with the chief Sáò Òsọ́nà). His only full biological sibling was his older brother Adéẹkùn. His brother Orímọlóyè was his older-half brother, who he later competed for the throne in 1882, Orímọlóyè was only older than him by a day. He had only one full biological sibling but several maternal and paternal half siblings. Because Oba Odundun I was later able to become king, under the omo-ori-ite rule in place (before it was repealed in 1991), a prince could only become king if they were born during the reign of their father. Because Odundun's father began his reign in 1834, he would have had to have been born after that. About 3 decades before his birth, in 1818, the Kingdom of Benin had invaded his father's homeland and executed Oba Arakale, his paternal grandfather. The invaders spared his father however, who lived in Benin City for a long period of time before returning to Akure after becoming king.

Through his paternal grandmother, who was a daughter of Oba Akengbuda of Benin, he also claimed direct descent from the imperial dynasty that had provided the Oba of Benin since the medieval period, and through it could therefore trace his lineage all the way back to antiquity. It was due to the fact that his grandmother was a Bini princess that his father Osupa – Akengbuda's grandson through her – had been spared during the invasion.

Reign
His father became king in 1834 and reigned till his death in 1846. Odundun married several wives and had many children, with some born before and during his reign. His first wife upon his rise to the throne was Adeke, he inherited her from his predecessor, Ojijigogun, and they had one son, Ogunlade (grandfather of the current Deji, Odundun II). Another son of his was Prince Adegbite. With his wife Ifamugbee from the Akure village of Ikota, he had one son, Ajari.

In 1882, the Deji of Akure, Oba Ojijigogun – who was his great uncle (as the younger brother of his father) – died. This created a vacancy in the office, and several eligible princes sought the throne, including Odundun and his cousins, the three sons of the deceased king: Arosoye, Ifaturoti, and Olofinlade. Oba Odundun was selected and crowned shortly afterwards.

One of the main things Oba Odundun I did was to sever the ties between Akure and Benin. When his father had become king in 1834, Akure began to pay a yearly tribute to the Benin Kingdom, and had continued doing so until Oba Odundun refused to pay it any longer. It is said that the officers that were sent to enforce control of Akure were oppressive and often raped and killed the people that they met there, so when Oba Odundun heard of this, he refused to pay the tribute anymore. Benin was unable to react at the time, as they were fighting against the British occupation that would eventually culminate in the Benin Expedition of 1897. Akure legend has it that through Odundun's power, he was able to kill the Oba of Benin, Adolo, who died in 1888. This act gave the Oba his 
oriki "Asodedero," which means One who makes the town peaceful.

Oba Odundun was known to be a brutal and ruthless tyrant, and is often compared to King Henry VIII of England, in that he swiftly executed one of his wives for sharing a joke with him in the bathroom. Another one of his wives, Olori Ifámùgbẹ̀ẹ from the nearby village of Ikota whom he married at the beginning of his reign, fled the palace in 1887 to the town of Ilara-Mokin because of his cruelty due to her childlessness. After visiting a babalawo in the town, she returned to the palace where she had a child the next year, Ajari.

Death and legacy
Oba Odundun I died in 1889 or 1890 at around the age of 55. After this, his father's direct lineage wouldn't produce another monarch for the duration of the succeeding century. His cousin Oba Arosoye became king, and when he died Prince Olofinlade, who had competed for the throne with him in 1882, succeeded. He ruled for the following 60 years as Oba Adesida I, thus establishing the Adesida dynasty that ruled Akure for 100 consecutive years. In the early 1990s, the Osupa family was recognized as one of the official ruling houses of the Akure Kingdom by the military administration of Ondo State. It has since provided two further monarchs, including current incumbent Oba Odundun II.

A prominent member of the Osupa/Odundun royal family is Oloye Olu Falae, a descendant of Oba Odundun I's father Oba Osupa through Odundun I's half-sister, Oba Odundun's great-great nephew. Falae was a civil servant and politician who served as secretary to the Government of the Federation during the administration of Ibrahim Badamasi Babangida. He also ran for the office of the president of Nigeria following the resumption of democracy in 1999.

Another one of his descendants include his great-grandson Ogunlade Aladetoyinbo Aladelusi, who later became the Deji of Akure, Oba Odundun II, the current king.

See also
 Oba of Benin
 Ogiso
 Akure Kingdom

References

19th-century Nigerian people
Nigerian royalty
Year of birth unknown
African royal families
Yoruba monarchs
19th-century monarchs in Africa